Laureano Ibarra (born April 22, 1983) is an American former competitive pair skater. He placed sixth at the 2002 World Junior Championships with Tiffany Vise and competed on the Grand Prix series with Meeran Trombley.

Personal life 
Ibarra was born in Miami, but raised in Venezuela. He began skating at age 11 after watching a Russian circus that included skating. Ibarra eventually moved back to Miami to train. His parents died when he was twelve and he was adopted by Dalilah Sappenfield and her husband.

Career 
Ibarra competed with Yesenia Camero, then Tiffany Vise from 2001–2003, Brandilyn Sandoval from 2003 through 2004, and Stephanie Kuban from 2004 through 2006. With Vise, he is the 2002 U.S. Junior national bronze medalist. They placed 6th at the 2002 World Junior Figure Skating Championships and won two medals on the Junior Grand Prix. 

Ibarra teamed up with Trombley in March 2006. They placed fifth at the 2007 Skate America. Their partnership ended following the 2008-2009 season when both retired from competitive skating.

Programs

With Trombley

With Vise

Competitive highlights

With Trombley

With Kuban

With Sandoval

With Vise

References

External links
 
 
 
 Pairs on Ice: Sandoval / Ibarra
 Pairs on Ice: Kuban / Ibarra
 Pairs on Ice: Vise / Ibarra
 2007 Nationals bio
  

1983 births
American male pair skaters
Living people
Sportspeople from Miami
American adoptees
21st-century American people